Zarda may refer to:
Power Princess, Marvel Comics character
Zarda (food), South Asian rice dish
 flavoured tobacco used in paan
 Altitude Express, Inc. v. Zarda was landmark case before the Supreme Court of the United States involving employment discrimination under the Title VII of the Civil Rights Act of 1964 related to sexual orientation.